Beveren is a municipality located in the Belgian province of East Flanders.

Beveren may also refer to:

 Beveren (Alveringhem)
 Beveren (rabbit), one of the oldest and largest breeds of fur rabbits
 K.S.K. Beveren, Belgian football club

See also
 Van Beveren, a surname